Kenneth Hanson (born April 14, 1982 in Sierra Madre, California) is an American former cyclist.

Major results

2007
 1st Stage 2b (TTT) Giro del Friuli Venezia Giulia
2008
 1st Stage 1 Rás Tailteann
 1st Stage 2 Priority Health Grand Cycling Challenge
2009
 1st Wells Fargo Twilight Criterium
 2nd Clarendon Cup
 3rd Manhattan Beach Grand Prix
2010
 1st Stage 5 Nature Valley Grand Prix
2011
 1st Stage 9 Tour de Korea
 2nd Overall Tulsa Tough
1st Stage 2
 3rd Glencoe Grand Prix
2012
 1st Overall Tulsa Tough
1st Stage 1
 1st Manhattan Beach Grand Prix
 1st Tour de Gastown
 1st Herman Miller Grand Cycling Classic
 1st Gooikse Pijl
 Vuelta del Uruguay
1st Stages 1, 5, 6 & 10
 Tour de Korea
1st Stages 7 & 8
 Tour of Elk Grove
1st Stages 2 & 3
 3rd De Kustpijl Heist
2013
 1st GP LabMed
 1st Stage 3 McLane Pacific Classic
 1st Stage 3 Volta ao Alentejo
 3rd Vuelta a La Rioja

References

External links

1982 births
Living people
American male cyclists
People from Sierra Madre, California
Cyclists from California